Union for Homeland and Labour (UPT) is a left-wing political party in Benin. Its president is Col. Martin Dohou Azonhiho, who was a leading ideologist of Mathieu Kérékou's socialist government in the 1980s. UPT supported former president Kérékou.

Together with five other parties, the UPT formed a coalition called the Acting Forces of Change in February 2009; this coalition was intended to support President Yayi Boni.

References

1997 establishments in Benin
Labour parties
Political parties established in 1997
Political parties in Benin
Socialist parties in Benin